Brighton is a coastal northern suburb of Brisbane, in the state of Queensland, in Australia.

Geography
Brighton and its neighbouring suburb Bald Hills are the northernmost suburbs of Brisbane.

Nashville is a neighbourhood in the south-west of the suburb.

Brighton has been mostly developed as suburban housing. In the north of the suburb there is some rural residential development and undeveloped wetlands. In the south-west of the locality are undeveloped wetlands which include Third Lagoon. The lagoon is so-called as it is one of the three lagoons of the Sandgate area, the first being Einbunpin Lagoon and the second being Dowse Lagoon which are both within the suburb of Sandgate.

History 
The Brighton Hotel located along Beaconsfield Terrace was believed to be built by David Rowntree Somerset. An early settler, Captain William Townsend, bought the Brighton Hotel and used it as his home and, once sold in 1893, it was used as an orphanage. It resumed being a hotel in 1912. The suburb takes its name from the hotel, which is believed to be named after Brighton in Sussex, England.

Land for a Methodist church was purchased in 1914. In January 1917, a small Sunday school was opened on the site.  In 1919, a Methodist church building was relocated from Killarney (where it had opened in 1902) to the Brighton site, where it was erected and officially opened on Saturday 5 June 1920. On Saturday 2 December 1939, 500 people attended the opening of a new church building by Reverend F. A. Malcolm, the President of the Methodist Conference. The previous church was relocated to the rear of the site to be used as a Sunday school hall. In 1977, the church joined in the amalgamation that created the Uniting Church in Australia becoming the Brighton Uniting Church. The church at 41 Deagon Street was closed circa 1999, and was later sold and the church and hall (the former church) were converted into a house. It is now within the suburb boundaries of Sandgate. It is listed on the Brisbane Heritage Register.

Brighton State School opened on 27 January 1920.

Since 1935, one or more of three adjacently positioned bridges have connected Brisbane to Redcliffe Peninsula between Brighton at their southern end and Clontarf on the peninsula at their northern end. The first of these to be built, the Hornibrook Bridge, has since been demolished upon completion of the Ted Smout Memorial Bridge in 2010, which now stands alongside the Houghton Highway, which opened in 1979.

Brighton was the site of the Second World War barracks of the RAAF Air Training School between December 1940 and May 1946; it was built on reclaimed land. It later became Eventide, a large nursing home run by the Queensland Government. More than 700 patients were transferred from Dunwich on North Stradbroke Island to the facility. It was announced in late 2012 that the nursing home would close because it was uneconomic to ensure that the aging buildings complied with building codes.

Brighton Baptist church at 77 North Road opened in 1958. It is now in private ownership and has been converted into a residence.

Nashville State School opened on 25 January 1960.

St Kieran's Catholic School opened on 2 February 1960.

In June 1990 the Uniting Church in Australia congregations of Boondall, Brighton, Sandgate and Shorncliffe decided to amalgamate. Their new Sandgate Uniting Church in Deagon was opened  in Sunday 20 November 1994.

The Autism Therapy & Education Centre opened on 27 January 1991.

The median age of the Brighton population was 40 years of age, 3 years above the Australian median. 78.4% of people living in Brighton were born in Australia, compared to the national average of 69.8%; the next most common countries of birth were England 5.3%, New Zealand 4.3%, Scotland 0.8%, Philippines 0.6%, Ireland 0.5%. 91.4% of people spoke only English at home; the next most popular languages were 0.5% German, 0.3% French, 0.3% Italian, 0.2% Tagalog, 0.2% Cantonese.

Heritage listings
Brighton has a number of heritage-listed sites, including:
 Hornibrook Highway: Hornibrook Bridge (mostly demolished in 2011)
Ex-RAAF barracks (on the site of Brighton Health Campus)

Education 
Brighton State School is a government primary (Prep-6) school for boys and girls at 2 North Road. In 2018, the school had an enrolment of 435 students with 32 teachers (27 full-time equivalent) and 21 non-teaching staff (12 full-time equivalent).

Nashville State School is a government primary (Prep-6) school for boys and girls on the corner of Baskerville and Douglas Streets. In 2018, the school had an enrolment of 352 students with 26 teachers (23 full-time equivalent) and 18 non-teaching staff (11 full-time equivalent).

St Kieran's Catholic School is a Catholic primary (Prep-6) school for boys and girls at 15 Greenwood Street. In 2018, the school had an enrolment of 277 students with 23 teachers (17 full-time equivalent) and 18 non-teaching staff (9 full-time equivalent).

Autism Queensland Education & Therapy Centre is a private primary and secondary (Prep-12) facility of Autism Queensland Education & Therapy Centre (headquartered at Sunnybank Hills) at 136 North Road.

Amenities
Brighton is serviced by a fortnightly visit of the Brisbane City Council's mobile library service in the car park at Decker Park on 25th Avenue.

There are a number of parks in the suburb, including:

 Beaconsfield Terrace Park (nos. 346 & 344)
 Brighton Park

 Decker Park

 Dianella Reserve

 Goodenia Reserve

 Gordon Street Park

 High Street Park (no.140)

 High Street Park (nos.132&134)

 Jill Street Park

 Massie Street Park

 North Road Park

 Pimelea Reserve

 Pomona Street Park

 Princess Street Park (no.23)

 Princess Street Park (nos.8-18)

 Queens Parade Park

 Queens Parade Park (no.93)

 Sandgate Foreshores Park

 Sandgate Third Lagoon Reserve

 Saul Street Park

 Shepherd Street Park (no.2)

 Stubbs Street Park

 Tenth Avenue Park

 Townsend Street Park

 Townsend Street Park (nos.31&12)

 Wakefield Park

Attractions

Brighton Wetlands 
Brighton has a woodland wetland protected by the local government. This natural reserve is made up of three woods; namely Goodenia Woods, Pimelea Woods and Dianella Woods. The land is so called a wetland as it fills with water during heavy rain which flows into a small tidal creek, Copold Creek, that flows under one of the main roads of Brighton, Beaconsfield Terrace, and then leads to Bramble Bay between 15th and 16th Avenues.

Brighton Esplanade 

Brighton is a desirable Brisbane suburb due to both the ease of public transport, such as the train service from nearby Sandgate, and also the bayside esplanade. This peaceful parkland esplanade follows the coast between the Houghton Highway bridge and Sandgate. The esplanade is used by walkers, cyclists and families. Brighton's beach is used by kite surfers and also walkers during low tide. The road that follows the esplanade is called Flinders Parade named after the navigator Captain Matthew Flinders who was the first European to discover the area in order to establish a penal colony for Lord Brisbane, Governor of New South Wales.

See also
 Redcliffe Peninsula road network

References

Further reading
  — full text available online

External links

 
 
 

Suburbs of the City of Brisbane
Queensland in World War II